The 2008–09 Louisiana–Lafayette Ragin' Cajuns men's basketball team  represented the University of Louisiana at Lafayette during the 2008–09 NCAA Division I men's basketball season. The Ragin' Cajuns, led by fifth-year head coach Robert Lee, played their home games at the Cajundome and were members of the West Division of the Sun Belt Conference. They finished the season 10–20, 7–11 in Sun Belt play to finish in fourth place in the Western Divisional standings. They competed in the 2009 Sun Belt Conference men's basketball tournament where they lost in the Quarterfinals to FIU. They were not invited to any other post-season tournament.

Roster

References

Louisiana Ragin' Cajuns men's basketball seasons
Louisiana-Lafayette
Louisiana
Louisiana